The Somaliland Declaration of Independence (formally Republic of Somaliland) was proclaimed on 18 May 1991 by Somali Sultans from the Isaaq, Dhulbahante, Issa, Gadabursi, Warsangali clans and the Somali National Movement.

Background

Independence from the United Kingdom

On June 26, 1960, the former British Somaliland protectorate briefly obtained independence as the State of Somaliland, with the Trust Territory of Somaliland following suit five days later. The following day, on June 27, 1960, the newly convened Somaliland Legislative Assembly approved a bill that would formally allow for the union of the State of Somaliland with the Trust Territory of Somaliland on 1 July 1960.

Muhammad Haji Ibrahim Egal, who had previously served as an unofficial member of the former British Somaliland protectorate's Executive Council and the Leader of Government Business in the Legislative Council, became the Prime Minister of the State of Somaliland during its planned transition to union with the Trust Territory of Somaliland under Italian Administration, the former Italian Somaliland.

During its brief existence, the State of Somaliland received international recognition from 35 countries, that included China, Egypt, Ethiopia, France, Ghana, Israel, Libya, the Soviet Union. The United States Secretary of State Christian Herter sent a congratulatory message, and the United Kingdom signed several bilateral agreements with Somaliland in Hargeisa on June 26, 1960. 
This a copy of the letter that United States Secretary of State Christian Herter sent 
And here is the letter that Elizabeth II send to the people of Somaliland in the independence day .

There were also fears of clashes with populations in Ethiopia.

On July 1, 1960, five days after the former British Somaliland protectorate obtained independence as the State of Somaliland, the territory united as scheduled with the Trust Territory of Somaliland to form the Somali Republic (Somalia).

A government was formed by Abdullahi Issa, with Haji Bashir Ismail Yusuf as President of the Somali National Assembly, Aden Abdullah Osman Daar as President and Abdirashid Ali Shermarke as Prime Minister, later to become President (from 1967 to 1969). On July 20, 1961, and through a popular referendum, the Somali people ratified a new constitution, which was first drafted in 1960. The constitution was widely regarded as unfair in the former Somaliland, however, and over 60% of the northern voters were against it in the referendum. Regardless, it was signed into law. Widespread dissatisfaction spread among the north's population, and British-trained officers attempted a revolt to end the union in December 1961. Their uprising failed, and Somaliland continued to be marginalized by the south during the next decades.

The Northern Peace Process

After the SNM was able to exert control over North-Western Somalia, the organisation quickly opted for a cessation of hostilities and reconciliation with non-Isaaq communities. A peace conference occurred in Berbera between 15 and 21 February 1991 restore trust and confidence between Northern communities whereby the SNM leadership had talks with representatives from the Issa, Gadabursi, Dhulbahante and Warsangeli clans. This was especially the case since non-Isaaq communities were said to have been largely associated with Siad Barre's regime and fought on opposing side of the Isaaq.

This conference laid the foundation for the "Grand Conference of the Northern Clans" which occurred in Burao between 27 April and 18 May 1991 which aimed to bring peace to Northern Somalia. After extensive consultations amongst clan representatives and the SNM leadership, it was agreed that Northern Somalia (formerly State of Somaliland) would revoke its voluntary union with the rest of Somalia to form the "Republic of Somaliland". Although there were hopes amongst of Northern communities for succession as early as 1961, the SNM did not have a clear policy on this matter from the onset. However, any nationalistic objectives amongst SNM members and supporters was abruptly altered in light of the genocide experienced under the Barre regime. As a result, strengthening the case for succession and reclamation of independence to the territory of State of Somaliland. Garaad Cabdiqani Garaad Jama who led the Dhulbahante delegation was first to table the case for succession.

Signing of Declaration of Independence

The signing of the Somaliland Declaration of Independence occurred on the May 5th resolution of the Burao grand conference. At the second national meeting on May 18, the SNM Central Committee, with the support of a meeting of elders representing the major clans in the northern regions, declared the restoration of the Republic of Somaliland in the territory of the former short-lived independent State of Somaliland and formed a government for the self-declared Country.

List of signatories

Seventeen Somali Sultans from Sool, Sanaag, Awdal, Woqooyi Galbeed and Togdheer signed the Declaration of Independence of Somaliland.

Woqooyi Galbeed
1.  Sultan Mohamed Sultan Farah
2.  Sultan Abdi SH. ahamed
3.  Sultan Mohamed Sultan Abdiqadir
4.  Sultan Sahardiid Sultan Diirye
5.  Sultan Ismael Muse
Togdheer
6.  Sultan Yuusuf Sultan Hirsi 
Sanaag
7.  Sultan Rashiid Sultan Ali
8.   Sultan Ismael Sultan mahamed 
9.   Ahmed Shiikh Saalah
Sool
10.  Shiikh Daahir Haaji Hasan
11.  Ahmed Hirsi Awl
12.  Garaad Abdiqani Garaad Jama
13.  Sultan Ali Muse
Awdal
14.  Sultan Mahamed Jama
15.  Shiikh Muse Jama
16.  Hasan Cumar Samatar
17.  Mahamed Warsame Shiil

The Declaration of Independence

In May 1991, the SNM announced the independence of "Somaliland" and the formation of an interim administration whereby Abdirahman Ahmed Ali Tuur was elected to govern for a period of two years. Many former SNM members were key in the formation of the government and constitution. The official proclamation of independence from the Government of Somalia is dated to the week ending 8 June 1991.

In May 1993 the "Borama Conference" took place to elect a new president and Vice President. The conference was attended by 150 elders from the Isaaq (88), Gadabursi (21), Dhulbahante (21), Warsengali (11) and Issa (9) communities and was endorsed by the SNM. As a result, the conference granted the government of Somaliland local legitimacy beyond the realms of the Isaaq dominated SNM, especially since the town of Borama was predominantly inhabited by the Gadabursi.

At this conference, the delegates agreed to establish an executive president and a bicameral legislature whereby Somaliland's second president Muhammad Haji Egal was elected. Egal would be re-elected for a second term in 1997.

Somaliland constitutional referendum

On May 31, 2001, a referendum was held on a draft constitution that affirmed the independence of Somaliland from Somalia. But the referendum was opposed by the Somali government and did not lead to any international recognition.

Borders

The boundaries declared by Somaliland in the Declaration are the British Somaliland borders established by Britain in 1884. Although a regional administration in Somalia claims the eastern borders of Somaliland in Sool and Sanaag, Somaliland controls 80% of Sool and Sanaag.

First Somaliland Council of Ministers (1991)

The first government of Somaliland was headed by Abdirahman Ahmed Ali Tuur as President of Somaliland and Hassan Isse Jama as Vice-President of Somaliland. The first Council of Ministries endorsed by the SNM Central Committee were as follows:

  Ministry of Internal Affairs and Municipalities: Saleebaan Mohamed Aadan
 Ministry of Foreign Affairs: Sheekh Yusuf Sh. Ali Sh. Madar
 Ministry of Finance: Ismail Mohamoud Hurry
 Ministry of Reconstruction & Rehabilitation: Hasan Adan Wadadid
 Ministry of Defence: Mohamed Kaahin Ahmed
 Mystery of Commerce & Industries: Daahir Mohamed Yusuf
 Ministry of Religion & Justice: Ahmed Ismail Abdi
 Ministry of Health & Labour: Abiib Diiriye Nuur
 Ministry of Education, Youth & Sports: Abdirahman Aw Farah
 Ministry of Fisheries & Coasts: Omer Eisa Awale
 Ministry of Planning & Development: Jama Rabile Good
 Ministry of Minerals & Water: Mohamed Ali Aateeye
 Ministry of Housing & Public Works: Mahdi Abdi Amarre
 Minstery of Information Tourists: Osman Aadan Dool
 Ministry of Livestock: Yasin Ahmed Haji Nur
 Ministry of Telecommunications & Transport (Somaliland): Mohamoud Abdi Ali Bayr
 Ministry of Agriculture & Environment: Sa’ed Mohamed Nur
 Ministry of Presidency: Yusuf Mohamed Ali
 Minstery of Internal Affairs: Ahmed Jambir Suldan
 Vice Minstery of Defence: Dahir Sheekh Abdillahi
 Vice Minstery of Finance: Aadan Jama Sahar
 Vice Minstery of Justice: Sheekh Mohamed Jama Aadan

See also

 British Somaliland
 Somali Civil War
 State of Somaliland
 List of international declarations

References

 
1991 documents
Declaration of Independence
Declarations of independence
History of Somaliland
History of Somalia